Adam Bischof (born 13 October 1915, date of death unknown) was an Austrian field hockey player. He competed in the men's tournament at the 1948 Summer Olympics.

References

External links
 

1915 births
Year of death missing
Place of birth missing
Austrian male field hockey players
Olympic field hockey players of Austria
Field hockey players at the 1948 Summer Olympics